Kim McLarin is an American novelist, best known for Growing Up X: A Memoir by the Daughter of Malcolm X, co-authored with Ilyasah Shabazz, and Jump at the Sun. Her works include contemporary novels, short stories and non-fiction.

Career 
McLarin has a bachelor's degree from Duke University.

She is a former staff writer for The New York Times, The Philadelphia Inquirer, The Greensboro News & Record and Associated Press. She is an associate professor at Emerson College in Boston.

McLarin is a regular panelist on Basic Black, Boston's longest-running weekly television program devoted exclusively to African-American themes, shown on WGBH.

McLarin has two children and lives in Boston.

Bibliography
Contemporary
Meeting of the Waters (Harper Perennial, 2001)
Jump at the Sun (William Morrow, 2006)

Short stories
 in Black Silk (A Collection Of African American Erotica) (2002)

Non-fiction
Taming It Down (Warner Books, 1998)
Growing up X, co-authored with Ilyasah Shabazz (Thorndike Press, 2002)
This Child Will Be Great, co-authored with Ellen Johnson Sirleaf (Harper/HarperCollins, 2009)
Divorce Dog: Men, Motherhood, and Midlife (C&r Press, 2012)
Womanish: A Grown Black Woman Speaks on Love and Life (Ig Publishing, 2019)
James Baldwin's Another Country (Ig Publishing, 2021)

Awards 
Won
 2007 Fiction Honor Book, of the Black Caucus of the American Library Association (for Jump at the Sun)

Nominated
 2007 Hurston/Wright Legacy Award for fiction (for Jump at the Sun)

References

External links

20th-century American novelists
21st-century American novelists
American women novelists
Living people
20th-century American women writers
21st-century American women writers
1964 births
African-American novelists
Emerson College faculty
Duke University alumni
American women academics
20th-century African-American women writers
20th-century African-American writers
21st-century African-American women writers
21st-century African-American writers